Chaoyang Town (朝阳镇) could refer to a number of towns in China:

Chaoyang, Wuxi County, Chongqing
Chaoyang, Zhangzhou, in Longwen District, Zhangzhou, Fujian
Chaoyang, Libo County, Guizhou
Chaoyang, Harbin, in Xiangfang District, Harbin, Heilongjiang
Chaoyang, Jiayin County, Heilongjiang
Chaoyang, Huade County, Ulanqab, Inner Mongolia
Chaoyang, Urat Front Banner, Inner Mongolia
Chaoyang, Lianyungang, in Lianyun District, Lianyungang, Jiangsu
Chaoyang, Shulan, Jilin
Chaoyang, Huinan County, Jilin
Chaoyang, Changtu County, Liaoning
Chaoyang, Shouyang County, Shanxi
Chaoyang, Neijiang, in Shizhong District, Neijiang, Sichuan